The Secret of Black Mountain is a 1917 silent film western short directed by Otto Hoffman and starring Vola Vale.

An incomplete print is preserved in the Library of Congress collection.

Cast
 Vola Vale - Miriam Vale
 Philo McCullough - Blake Stanley
 Charles Dudley - Ed Stanley
 George Austin - George Cooper (* as Frank Austin)
 Henry Crawford - Barton
 Mignon LeBrun - Sarah Stanley
 James Warner - Henry Stanley
 Lewis King - Jake DeWitt
 Jack McLaughlin - Jim Vale
 Gibson Gowland - Jack Rance
 H. C. Russell - Old Bill

References

External links
 
 

1917 films
1917 Western (genre) films
American black-and-white films
American silent short films
Silent American Western (genre) films
1910s American films
1910s English-language films